Historis is a genus of butterflies in the family Nymphalidae found from Mexico to South America.

Species
There are two recognised species:
Historis acheronta (Fabricius, 1775) – dashwing, tailed cecropian
Historis odius (Fabricius, 1775) – stinky leafwing, Orion

References

Coeini
Nymphalidae of South America
Butterfly genera
Taxa named by Jacob Hübner